Louis Henry Kretlow (June 27, 1921 – September 12, 2007) was an American professional baseball pitcher who played in the Major Leagues (MLB) for the Detroit Tigers (1946; 1948–49), St. Louis Browns / Baltimore Orioles (1950, 1953, 1954–55), Chicago White Sox (1950–53), and Kansas City Athletics (1956). Kretlow attended the University of Oklahoma (1941–42) and served in the U.S. Army Air Forces during World War II (1943–45), before beginning his pro career in 1946.

Over ten MLB seasons, Kretlow posted a 27–47 won–lost record in 199 games pitched (104 started), with 22 complete games, three shutouts, 43 games finished, one save, a 4.87 earned run average and 1.659 WHIP. In  innings pitched, he allowed 781 hits, 479 runs (425 earned) and 522 bases on balls. He was credited with 450 strikeouts.

Lou Kretlow died in Enid of natural causes at the age of 86.

References

External links

1921 births
2007 deaths
Baltimore Orioles players
Baseball players from Oklahoma
Buffalo Bisons (minor league) players
Businesspeople from Oklahoma
Chicago White Sox players
Detroit Tigers players
Kansas City Athletics players
Major League Baseball pitchers
People from Caddo County, Oklahoma
St. Louis Browns players
Seattle Rainiers players
Sportspeople from Enid, Oklahoma
Sports world record setters
Williamsport Grays players
Williamsport Tigers players
20th-century American businesspeople